Baardson or Bårdson is a Norwegian surname. Notable people with the surname include:

Bentein Baardson (born 1953), Norwegian actor and theatre director
Brynjolv Baardson (1921–2002), Norwegian sailor and businessman

See also
Baardsen

Norwegian-language surnames